Norman Street may refer to:

 Norm Street (1876–1963), Australian rugby union player
 Norman Street (cricketer) (1881–1915), English soldier and cricketer